Alba Rosa Viëtor (July 18, 1889 – April 15, 1979) was an Italian-born violinist and composer who settled in the United States in 1919.

Biography 
Alba Rosa grew up in Milan, where she was admitted to the Milan Conservatory at the age of 8. She was the youngest student ever to be admitted. At the age of 14 she continued her studies in Brussels, after a short stay in Uruguay. Here she studied under the famed violinist César Thomson and later she studied under the creator of the
Sevcik violin method, Otakar Ševčík. One of his notable students was Jan Kubelík, who would become her mentor and to whose memory she dedicated her Elegie.
In 1919 she settled permanently in the United States, and married Jan Fresemann Viëtor, a Dutch businessman who was a skilled amateur violinist.

After a successful career as a  violinist, in 1916 she played alongside Camille Saint-Saëns on piano during a tour in Argentina, she decided to end this and dedicated herself completely to composing.

After her divorce (the marriage was dissolved in 1940; Jan died in 1953 in Panama) she became a member of the National Association for American Composers and Conductors. She composed prolifically for orchestra, voice and various solo instruments. Several American orchestras and soloists including the National Gallery of Art Symphony Orchestra and the Frost Symphony Orchestra, have performed her works. Her compositions were performed in the same program as Charles Ives, Aaron Copland and John Philip Sousa by the National Gallery Orchestra in 1950.

The most important element that dominates all of Alba Rosa Vietor's work is not the form but rather the mood she wishes to convey. Lawrence A. Johnson calls one of her best known works, Primavera Lombarda (Springtime in Lombardy), "an intriguing moody Mediterranean tone poem".

After her death in 1979 her compositions fell into oblivion. Due to the initiative of her son Hendrik Viëtor to digitize the works of his mother, her works have been performed more frequently since 2003.

Her works have been archived by the Marta & Austin Weeks Music Library of the University of Miami.

The Alba Rosa Viëtor Foundation and Alba Rosa Viva! chamber music festival 
The Alba Rosa Viëtor Foundation was founded by Mary van Veen-Viëtor, Hermance Viëtor and Maarten van Veen in 2009 to promote knowledge of Rosa Viëtor's music and to encourage improvisation and composition, particularly by female composers. The Foundation has published a book, The Story of Alba Rosa Viëtor: Violinist and Composer 1889–1979 (2009), which includes essays about her works by Paul Janssen and Peter Fraser MacDonald, as well as a list of compositions. The Foundation have also released a CD with a recording of her Piano Trio Op. 8 by the Storioni Trio.

In 2014, the Foundation started a biannual chamber music festival, Alba Rosa Viva! This festival is not only intended to make the works of Alba Rosa heard, but also to draw attention to other female composers, whose works are rarely heard in the classical music halls. Some recent compositions are always part of the festival program. The Festival is an idea of artistic director Reinild Mees, who had already put Alba Rosa Viëtor’s music in the spotlight during the Women's Music Marathon in the Concertgebouw Amsterdam.

The Foundation also organizes the biennial Alba Rosa Viëtor Composition Competition for composers up to 35 years old, with a jury headed by composer Willem Jeths. The compositions of the finalists are performed during the festival.

Compositions 
Source:

Works for piano solo 
	Capriccio				1914
	Piccolo Danza				1914
	Gavotte Rococo			        1916
	Tema Fugato				1916
	Valse Lente				1916
	Studio (Etude)				1917
	Allegro Appassionato			1918
	Barcarola (A Jan)			1918
	Eileen’s Refrain			1935
	Indian Dance				1935
	Calma					1936
	Nocturne				1936
	Tin Soldiers				1936
	Truitje Danst op Klompies		1936
	Scherzo				        1937
	Incertezza				1939
	Danse Grotesque			        1946
	Sonata					1948
	Variations On London Bridge		1950
	Plainte Chromatique I+II		1951
	Playground				1951
	Preludio				1951
	Five Sketches				1953
	Children Singing			1965
	Making Money				1965
	Dreams					1965
	Billy’s Prayer				1966
	Frolics					1966
	Richiamo [Remembrance]		        1972
	Pezzi					1973
	Dialogue				1977

Works for violin and piano 
	Giuochi					1916
	Valse Romantique			1939
	Canzonetta				1939
	Elegie [in memory of Jan Kubelik] 	1941
	Rhapsody				1952

Chamber music works 
	Canzonetta		1939	piano, violin, cello
Quintetto in La Minore			1940	piano, string quartet
	Duetto Fugato all’ Antica		1950	2 pianos
	Piano Trio in A minor		1951	piano, violin, cello
Intermezzo				1952	violin I, violin II, viola, violoncello, double bass
	Little Suite				1952	piano, violin I, violin II
	Evening Bells				1956	carillon
	Chimes at Dusk				1956	violin, viola
	Four [Humoristic] Sketches 		1957	piano, violin I, violin II
	Little Poem				1958	violin I, violin II, viola
	Recitativo				1959	violin I, violin II, viola
	Serenade In Pre-Modern Style		1961	timpani, harp, violin I, violin II
	Duet					1962	flute, clarinet
	Toddler at Play				1966	flute, violin, piano, percussion
	Billy’s Prayer				1967	flute, clarinet Bb, bassoon
	Four Pieces				1968	[2 instr.]
	Suite					1969	piano, flute, violin, violoncello
	Ritornello				1976	oboe, piano
	Tarantella				1976	oboe, piano
•	Popolino				1979	clarinet, piano

Works for orchestra 
	Primavera Lombarda 			1949
	Mediolanum				1950
	The Blue Bird Suite 			1951
	Symphonietta [Sinfonietta]		1959
	Ballet Suite (Tabloid) 			1960
	Five Symphonic Sketches		        1962

Vocal works 
	To A Violinist				1940
	Wall Street [Text by Burton]		1940
	High Flight [Text by Magee]		1941
	Virgilian Spring [Text from Virgil]	1941
	Invocation				1945
	Forget Me Not				1945
	Dedication [Text by Roche]		1945
	Chiusa (Longing)			1947
	Rimpianto				1947
	Malia					1955
	To My Darling				1957
	The Meadow Lark			        1958
	Nostalgia				1959
	Little Refrain				1960
	Two Choral Songs			1961
	My Birthday Song			1962
	L’orgoglio				1963
	Rhythm Song				1963
	Goodbye To Naples			1967
	Two Poems				1973

Popular works for piano 

	Valse De Salon				1936
	Tango Habernera			        1949
	Noche De Verano (Tango)		        1949
	Paraphrase On “South Pacific”		1949

References

External links 

 Scores of Alba Rosa Viëtor compositions
 CD Piano trio Alba Rosa Viëtor by the Storioni trio
 Website Alba Rosa Viëtor Foundation
 University of Miami: Marta & Austin Weeks Music Library: Alba Rosa Vietor Archive

1889 births
1979 deaths
Musicians from Milan
Italian women classical composers
Italian classical composers
Italian classical violinists
American women classical composers
American classical composers
American classical violinists
20th-century classical composers
Italian emigrants to the United States
20th-century Italian composers
20th-century American women musicians
20th-century classical violinists
Women classical violinists
20th-century women composers
20th-century Italian women
20th-century American violinists